The Tomcar (stylized as TOMCAR) is a type of commercial off-road utility vehicle. The name was used earlier on a French 50cc microcar which could be operated without a license.

Tomcar is a manufacturer of off-road UTV vehicles. All Tomcars start with a fully welded frame and roll cage utilizing steel on load-bearing components and an aircraft-grade aluminum skid plate for impact protection.
 
The users of Tomcars range from mining companies, cinematographers, recreational hunters, and special operations groups.

History and operations
The Tomcar company was founded in Kibbutz Givat HaShlosha, Israel by Yoram Zarhi, in the 1980s. The company has a workshop in Israel, a manufacturing plant in Arizona, United States, and a planned assembly plant in Dubai, United Arab Emirates.

Tomcars are used by the United States Marine Corps. They were also purchased by the British armed forces for use in Afghanistan, among other operations. They were used to retrieve supply drops. These were later sold in the private sector.

Models 

The Tomcar TM, the original Tomcar that remains in use today, is a 2WD 2, 4, or 6 seater vehicle with varying cargo space and both combustion and electric powertrain options.

The Tomcar TX, is a 4WD vehicle. The TX has 17" ground clearance, 4-wheel independent suspension, a one-piece fully welded frame and roll cage, an aluminum skid plate, and a low center of gravity intended to maximize safety, stability, and performance. It also has a one ton payload.

References

External links 

 Tomcar.com

Off-road vehicles
All-wheel-drive vehicles
Military vehicles of Israel
Military light utility vehicles
ATVs
Recreational vehicle manufacturers